Denis Parsons Burkitt, MD, FRCS(Ed), FRS (28 February 1911 – 23 March 1993) was an Irish surgeon who made significant advances in health, such as the etiology of a pediatric cancer, now called Burkitt's lymphoma, and the finding that rates of colorectal cancer are higher in those who eat limited dietary fibre.

Life and death 
Burkitt was born in Enniskillen, County Fermanagh, Ireland. He was the son of James Parsons Burkitt, a civil engineer. Aged eleven he lost his right eye in an accident. He attended Portora Royal School in Enniskillen and Dean Close School, England. In 1929 Burkitt entered Trinity College, Dublin to study engineering, but believing his evangelical calling was to be a doctor, he transferred to medicine and graduated in 1935. In 1938 he passed the Royal College of Surgeons of Edinburgh fellowship examinations. On 28 July 1943 he married Olive Rogers.

During World War II, Burkitt served with the Royal Army Medical Corps in England and later in Kenya and Somaliland. After the war, Burkitt decided his future lay in medical service in the developing world and he moved to Uganda. He eventually settled in Kampala and remained there until 1964.

Burkitt was president of the Christian Medical Fellowship and wrote frequently on religious/medical themes. In 1979, he became an honorary fellow of Trinity College Dublin. He received the Bower Award and Prize in 1992. He died of a stroke on 23 March 1993 in Gloucester and was buried in Bisley, Gloucestershire, England.

Scientific contributions 
Burkitt made two major contributions to medical science related to his experience in Africa.

Burkitt's lymphoma

The first was the description, distribution, and ultimately, the etiology of a pediatric cancer that bears his name, Burkitt's lymphoma.

Burkitt in 1957 observed a child with swellings in the angles of the jaw. "About two weeks later ... I looked out the window and saw another child with a swollen face ... and began to investigate these jaw tumors." "Having an intensely enquiring mind, Burkitt took the details of these cases to the records department ... which showed that jaw tumours were common, [and] were often associated with other tumours at unusual sites" in children in Uganda. He kept copious notes and concluded that these apparently different childhood cancers were all manifestations of a single type of malignancy. Burkitt published A sarcoma involving the jaws of African children. The newly identified cancer became known as "Burkitt's lymphoma". He went on to map the geographical distribution of the tumour. Burkitt, together with Dr. Dennis Wright, published a book titled Burkitt's Lymphoma in April 1970.

Dietary fibre
His second major contribution came when, on his return to Britain, Burkitt compared the pattern of diseases in African hospitals with Western diseases. He concluded that many Western diseases which were rare in Africa were the result of diet and lifestyle. He wrote a book, Don't Forget Fibre in your Diet, which became an international bestseller.

Burkitt suggested that higher fibre intake can reduce the risk of colorectal cancer. This was based on observations of the difference in patterns of diseases between Western and traditional African societies. Burkitt noted the lower rates of colorectal cancer in African countries compared to the West. He also found that African diets were generally higher in dietary fibre. While a 2020 meta study found no clear connection a 2020 study confirmed the protective effect if the source of fibre is whole grains.

Research suggests that a diet high in dietary fibre is also advised as a precaution against other diseases such as heart disease and diabetes.

Publications by Burkitt
Academic journals
 
 
 

Books
 
 
 Kellock B, Burkitt D. P. The Fibre Man: The Life-story of Dr. Denis Burkitt: Lion Pub.; 1985.

See also 

 A 1990 interview with Burkitt

References

Further reading

External links
 Burkitt's entry at Whonamedit?, a biographical dictionary of medical eponyms
 A portrait of Burkitt

1911 births
1993 deaths
People from Enniskillen
British public health doctors
Diet food advocates
20th-century Irish medical doctors
Alumni of Trinity College Dublin
British surgeons
High-fiber diet advocates
People educated at Portora Royal School
People educated at Dean Close School
Royal Army Medical Corps officers
British Army personnel of World War II
Fellows of the Royal College of Surgeons of Edinburgh
Fellows of the Royal Society
Honorary Fellows of Trinity College Dublin
Members of the French Academy of Sciences
British emigrants to Uganda
Recipients of the Lasker-DeBakey Clinical Medical Research Award
20th-century surgeons